The School District of Amery is school district located in Amery, Wisconsin, United States. It serves students from early childhood through 12th grade. The School District of Amery has four buildings located on a campus within the Amery City limits and the buildings are as follows, Amery High School, Amery Middle School, Amery Intermediate School, Amery Lien Elementary School.

References

External links
Amery School District

School districts in Wisconsin
Education in Polk County, Wisconsin